The Friends of Durruti Group (in Spanish, Agrupación de los Amigos de Durruti) was an anarchist group in Spain, named after Buenaventura Durruti. It was founded on 15 March 1937, by Jaime Balius, Félix Martínez and Pablo Ruiz.

The group edited the newspaper El Amigo del Pueblo from May 1937 to February 1938. The Friends of Durruti Group's document "Towards a Fresh Revolution" has been a major influence on the platformist tendency within anarchism.

History
The group was formed from a current of workers that defined themselves against the collaboration of the CNT with the government, and milicianos who returned to Barcelona to fight against the militarization of the militias. Thus, most of the members of the new group were former members of the Fourth Group of the Durruti Column, at the head of which Pablo Ruiz, Progreso Ródenas and Eduardo Cerveró had been, among others.

From its establishment on 17 March, until 3 May, the Group held several meetings, launched various manifests and leaflets, demanding the release of the libertarian leader Francisco Maroto del Ojo, sabotaged the intervention of Federica Montseny at a meeting on 11 April and filled the walls of Barcelona with posters explaining their program.

The essayist Miquel Amorós (The Betrayed Revolution) identifies the Barcelona May Days with the revolutionary platform of the Friends of Durruti. According to this author, the Friends of Durruti was the only political group in the entire republican zone with an authentic revolutionary program capable of setting objectives for the spontaneous revolution of the masses of July 1936 and which was exhausted after the "May events" due to the counterrevolutionary actions of the Stalinists allied with the republican bourgeoisie and the CNT ministers (Federica Montseny, García Oliver, etc.).

The Friends of Durruti program includes:

 The destruction of the capitalist economy and any form of state, and the establishment of libertarian communism.
 The substitution of the State and capitalism by unions as economic institutions, municipalities as political institutions, and the federation from the bottom-up as a means of establishing links between unions and municipalities.

On 5 May, during the so-called May Days of 1937, they published a leaflet stating that "A Revolutionary Junta has been constituted in Barcelona. All those responsible for the coup d'etat, who maneuver under government protection, will be executed. The POUM will be a member of the Revolutionary Junta because they supported the workers." Both the CNT and the FIJL refused to participate in the group's initiative, but its approach to the POUM (communist anti-Stalinist party), would result in the group's headquarters being closed and its main officials repeatedly imprisoned, although usually for brief periods. 

We find in the group's paper El Amigo del Pueblo a hard rejection of the measures taken by the State in order to return to a pre-revolutionary situation; in the issues from May to July the revolutionary struggles of May were vindicated, repeatedly rejecting the accusations made from many sectors calling them "provocative and irresponsible agents". They denounced censorship of the written press and described them as "counter-revolutionary maneuvers".

In September 1937, brigades integrated into the Popular Army (many of which had previously been part of the CNT militias), took the town of Belchite. The pages of El Amigo del Pueblo claimed this to be the work of the "Confederate forces", while continuing to denounce the constant repression suffered by the group.

In many of their issues they launched proclamations in favor of the CNT and the FAI, despite having numerous points of disagreement with both. It also emphasized the need to remember "the experiences of the May Days".

Several scholars consider that the Friends of Durruti were in a process of ideological separation with moderate anarchism, and that after the experience of the class struggle in the Spanish Civil War, they turned left in the direction of a more organized and strategic anarchism. These faists, disappointed with the collaboration of the anarcho-syndicalist CNT's moderate wing with the state capitalist government, came to sudden reflections such as the following:

In 1939 there was a reformation of the group, the exiled Franco-Spanish Group "The Friends of Durruti", which reestablished and dissolved itself on several occasions. They began to publish a new series of the newspaper El Amigo del Pueblo, in 1961 from France.

See also
Barcelona May Days

References

Anarchist organisations in Spain
Defunct anarchist militant groups
Defunct platformist organizations
Defunct anarchist organizations in Europe
Military units and formations established in 1937
Military units and formations disestablished in 1939

External links
Friends of Durruti articles hosted by Libcom.org
The Friends of Durruti Group: 1937-1939
Spain 1936 and the Friends of Durruti